Joint unconventional warfare is the inter-agency, or international implementation of an unconventional warfare strategy, comprising elements of asymmetric warfare, irregular warfare, urban warfare and various forms of psychological operations deployed by non-traditional means.

Joint unconventional warfare would fall under the COIN theory of military operations, generally used in Counter-insurgency operations.  The form of military activity has come very much into popular usage under the aegis of General David Petraeus and the former General General Stanley McCrystal.

Definitions 
The U.S. Naval definition of unconventional warfare comprises: "military and paramilitary operations, predominantly conducted through, with, or by indigenous or surrogate forces organized, trained, equipped, supported, and directed in varying degrees by an external source. Unconventional warfare includes, but is not limited to, guerrilla warfare, sabotage, subversion, intelligence activities, and unconventional assisted recovery".

The U.S. Army field manual describes unconventional warfare as “intent of United States unconventional warfare operations is to exploit a hostile power’s political, military, economic, and psychological vulnerability by developing and
sustaining resistance forces to accomplish U.S. strategic objectives.”

Joint Unconventional Warfare Task Force Execute Order 
The Joint Unconventional Warfare Task Force Execute Order was a secret directive signed by General David Petraeus on 30 September 2009, which provided U.S. military and intelligence forces unprecedented powers to conduct operations on the sole mandate of operational military commandants.  The JUWTF was reported by the New York Times on 25 May 2010, and was part of a wide-scale program providing unlimited powers to the U.S. military and intelligence community called Project Avocado, this being a program authorized by President Barack Obama during summer 2009, on the advisory of former General General Stanley McCrystal.

See also 
 Project Avocado
 COIN
 Foreign internal defense
 asymmetric warfare
 irregular warfare
 urban warfare
 psychological operations

References

Publications 
 Army Special Operations Forces and Marine Expeditionary Unit (Special Operations Capable) Integration: Something a Joint Task Force Commander Should Consider, MAJ Kevin T Henderson, United States Army, School of Advanced Military Studies, United States Army Command and General Staff College, Fort Leavenworth, Kansas.

Counterinsurgency
Warfare by type